Konrad Matuszewski (born 4 October 2001) is a Polish professional footballer who plays as a left-back for Warta Poznań.

Club career
On 15 July 2021, he joined Ekstraklasa side Warta Poznań on a three-year deal.

References

External links

2001 births
Living people
Association football defenders
Polish footballers
Poland youth international footballers
Legia Warsaw II players
Legia Warsaw players
Wigry Suwałki players
Odra Opole players
Warta Poznań players
Ekstraklasa players
I liga players
III liga players
People from Włoszczowa County